Harrisia donae-antoniae is a species of cactus.

donae-antoniae
Cacti of North America
Cacti of South America
Flora of the Caribbean
Plants described in 1991
Flora without expected TNC conservation status